Jharsar Chhota is a village in Taranagar tehsil of Churu district in Rajasthan.People live with unity in this village.

Location
It is situated in 50 km northeast direction of Churu city and 27 km southeast of Taranagar. Its neighbouring villages are Dhani Poonia, Ratanpura, Rajpura, Satyun, Abhaypura, Amarpura dham

Jat Gotras
Kasnia (कासनिया)
Dhuwan (धुआं)
Bhakar(भाकर)
Poonia (poonia)

Population
As of the census of 2011, there are 1086 people out of them 572 are male and 514 are female.

Religion
All people belong to Hindu religion. There is one temple of Hanuman.

References

Villages in Churu district